Richard Waterhouse may refer to:

 Richard Green Waterhouse (1855–1922), American Methodist bishop
 Richard Waterhouse (general) (1832–1876), American Civil War general